Pandesma is a genus of moths in the family Erebidae. The genus was erected by Achille Guenée in 1852.

Species
 Pandesma anysa Guenée, 1852
 Pandesma decaryi (Viette, 1966)
 Pandesma fugitiva Walker, 1858
 Pandesma muricolor Berio, 1966
 Pandesma partita Walker, 1858
 Pandesma quenavadi Guenée, 1852
 Pandesma robusta Walker, [1858]
 Pandesma submurina Walker, 1865

References

Pandesmini
Moth genera
Taxa named by Achille Guenée
Taxa named by Jean Baptiste Boisduval